Canada competed at the 1994 Winter Olympics in Lillehammer, Norway. Canada has competed at every Winter Olympic Games.

Medalists

Competitors
The following is the list of number of competitors in the Games.

Alpine skiing

Men

Women

Biathlon

Men

Women

Bobsleigh

Cross-country skiing

Figure skating

Freestyle skiing

Men

Women

Ice hockey

Team roster:
Mark Astley
Adrian Aucoin
David Harlock
Corey Hirsch
Todd Hlushko
Greg Johnson
Fabian Joseph
Paul Kariya
Chris Kontos
Ken Lovsin
Derek Mayer
Petr Nedvěd
Dwayne Norris
Greg Parks
Jean-Yves Roy
Brian Savage
Brad Schlegel
Wally Schreiber
Chris Therien
Todd Warriner
Brad Werenka
Head coach: Tom Renney
Group B

February 13

February 15

February 17

February 19

February 21

Medal Round
Quarter-finals

Semi-finals

 Gold Medal Game

Luge

Short track speed skating

Men

Women

Speed skating

Men

Women

References

 Olympic Winter Games 1994, full results by sports-reference.com

Nations at the 1994 Winter Olympics
1994
Winter Olympics